Cherokee Trail High School is a public secondary-educational institution located in the eastern portion of the city of Aurora, Colorado, United States.  It is the sixth high school in the Cherry Creek School District.  Cherokee Trail is an International Baccalaureate certified school.

Academics 
Cherokee Trail offers various academic opportunities for students. The school is one of two International Baccalaureate certified high schools in the Cherry Creek School District and it also offers a selection of Advanced Placement courses. In the 2006-2007 school year CTHS was rated "High" (out of Unsatisfactory, Low, Average, High and Excellent) by the Colorado Department of Education for the high school level. The school consistently scores above the state average in all subjects and grades for the Partnership for Assessment of Readiness for College and Careers (PARCC) tests. Cherokee Trail juniors who take the ACT college admissions test (it is a Colorado mandate that all juniors take the ACT test (pre-2016), also consistently score at or near both the state and national averages.

Demographics
The demographic breakdown of the 2,633 students enrolled for the 2013-2014 school year was:
Male - 50.5%
Female - 49.5%
Native American/Alaskan - 0.6%
Asian/Pacific islanders - 10.5%
Black - 11.5%
Hispanic - 14.3%
White - 58.6%
Unknown - 4.5%

In addition, 14.0% of the students were eligible for free or reduced lunch.

Athletics 
Cherokee Trail offers many boys' and girls' sports including football, basketball, lacrosse, soccer, softball, swimming, and tennis. CTHS competes in the 5A league for sports.

Cherokee Trail is home to Legacy Stadium, the largest school stadium in Colorado. It boasts an advanced artificial grass field, ticket booths, cable broadcasting cameras, and A/V equipment, as well as modern architecture. This stadium is shared with other schools in the district. The campus also has a 25-yard swimming pool and a 12-foot diving well with two one-meter diving boards, multiple tennis courts, soccer fields, a softball field, and two baseball diamonds.

On May 19, 2007,  the boys' track and baseball teams won the Colorado State Championship in their respective sports.

References 

Public high schools in Colorado
Education in Aurora, Colorado
Cherry Creek School District
International Baccalaureate schools in Colorado
Educational institutions established in 2003
Schools in Arapahoe County, Colorado
2003 establishments in Colorado